James Hamilton (16 June 1901 – 1975) was a Scottish footballer who played as a left back for Vale of Clyde, St Mirren, Rangers, Blackpool, Barrow, Armadale and Scotland. He was a full-back.

Career

Blackpool
Bargeddie (Lanarkshire)-born Hamilton made his debut for Harry Evans' Blackpool at home to Bristol City on 15 September 1928, six games into their 1928–29 Football League campaign. He made a further 24 League appearances that season as the Tangerines finished eighth in Division Two.

He started the first three League games of the following 1929–30 season, which proved to be the club's first and, as of 2015, only championship that saw them promoted to the top flight for the first time. They were his final appearances for the club.

References

Sources

External links

1901 births
1975 deaths
Date of death missing
Scottish footballers
Association football fullbacks
Scotland international footballers
Vale of Clyde F.C. players
St Mirren F.C. players
Rangers F.C. players
Hull City A.F.C. players
Blackpool F.C. players
Barrow A.F.C. players
Armadale F.C. players
Scottish Football League players
Scottish Football League representative players
Scottish Junior Football Association players
Scotland junior international footballers
Footballers from North Lanarkshire
English Football League players